European Business School is the name of several educational institutions:
 European Business School Dublin (Ireland)
 EBS University of Business and Law in Oestrich-Winkel and Wiesbaden (Germany), up to 2011 operating under the name European Business School International University Schloss Reichartshausen
 European Business School London (Great Britain)
 European Business School Madrid (Spain)
 European Business School Paris (France)
 European University operating as EU Business School in Barcelona (Spain), Munich (Germany), Geneva and Montreux (Switzerland)
 European Business School Brussels (Belgium)
 For the "European Business School Cambridge", see  Isles International University.